Henry Lee may refer to:

People 
Sir Henry Lee of Ditchley (1533–1611), Master of the Ordnance and Queen's Champion under Elizabeth I of England, MP for Buckinghamshire
Henry Lee (Canterbury MP) (c. 1657–1734), MP for Canterbury
Capt. Henry Lee I (1691–1747), of Lee Hall, Westmoreland County Virginia; Virginian colonist, grandfather of Henry Lee III
Major General Henry Lee II (1730–1787), of Leesylvania, father of Henry "Light-Horse Harry" Lee III
Major General Henry Lee III (1756–1818), nicknamed "Light-Horse Harry", Virginia governor and Congressman as well as early American officer
Henry Lee IV (1787–1837), also known as "Black Horse Harry" Lee, half-brother of Robert E. Lee and son of Henry Lee III
Henry Lee (economist) (1782–1867), proponent of free trade and candidate for Vice President of the United States in 1832
Henry Lee (naturalist) (1826?–1888), English aquarium director and author
Henry Lee (Australian politician) (1856–1927), Australian politician
Henry A. G. Lee (c. 1818–1851), newspaper editor, politician, militia officer in Oregon, United States
Henry B. Lee (1781–1817), U.S. Representative from New York
Henry David Lee (1849–1928), American businessman
Henry W. Lee (socialist) (1865–1932), British socialist
Henry Lee (forensic scientist) (born 1938), Chinese-American forensic scientist
Henry Wesley Lee, American child actor who played "Spike" in the Our Gang shorts
Henry Lee (Southampton MP) (1817–1904), British Member of Parliament for Southampton, 1880–1885
Henry Lee Junior (born 1958), Hong Kong celebrity and racing driver
Henry Lee (actor) (born 1949), Hong Kong TVB actor
Henry W. Lee (bishop) (1815–1874), Episcopal bishop in America
Henry Lee (cyclist) (1887–?), British Olympic cyclist
Henry Austin Lee (1847–1918), British diplomat, governor and landowner
Henry Pelham Lee (1877–1953), English engine pioneer
Henry Lee (surgeon), British surgeon, pathologist and syphilologist
Henry Lee Lucas (1936–2001), American criminal, convicted of murder and once listed as America's most prolific serial killer

Music 
"Henry Lee", an alternate title of "Young Hunting", a traditional murder ballad originating in Scotland.

See also
Harry Lee (disambiguation)
Henry Ley (disambiguation)